Millicent Mary Lillian Martin (born 8 June 1934) is an English actress, singer, and comedian. She was the lone female singer of topical songs on the weekly BBC Television satirical show That Was the Week That Was (known as TW3; 1962–1963), and won a BAFTA TV Award in 1964. For her work on Broadway, she received Tony Award nominations for Side by Side by Sondheim (1977) and King of Hearts (1978), both for Best Featured Actress in a Musical. Other television roles include her recurring role as Gertrude Moon in the NBC sitcom Frasier (2000–04) and Joan Margaret in Grace & Frankie (2017-2022).

Life and career
Martin was born in Romford, Essex.

Theatre 
Early clippings show Martin as one of the cast in the pantomime "Dick Whittington" starring Jimmy Hanley at the Granada Tooting in December 1949 The following year she was in "Aladdin" at the Pavilion Bournemouth in December 1950 and in May 1951 she appeared in "The Happiest Days of Your Life" at the Playhouse, Oxford playing an "enterprising" pupil. December 1951, saw her in the pantomime "Mother Goose" at the Theatre Royal, Birmingham. 

She attended the Italia Conti theatre school and not long after leaving the school, she made her Broadway debut alongside Julie Andrews in The Boy Friend in September 1954. She remained in the show until November 1955. 

In December 1964 she played the role of Tweeny in a musical version of the Admirable Crichton with Kenneth More in London's West End, the show called "Our Man Crichton".

Her additional New York theatre credits include taking over as Dorothy Brock in the original Broadway production of 42nd Street in the 1980s and performing the revue Side by Side by Sondheim with Julia McKenzie and David Kernan in 1977, for which she was nominated for the Tony Award for Best Featured Actress in a Musical. She received a second Tony nomination for the musical King of Hearts (1978).

In London, Martin starred with Paul Scofield and James Kenney in Expresso Bongo at the Saville Theatre. In 1959, she had also appeared in The Crooked Mile. Also in West End, she starred opposite Jim Dale in The Card in 1975.

In 1988, Martin joined the London production of the Sondheim musical Follies, starring with Eartha Kitt.

More recently, in 2008, she appeared at the Open Air Theatre, Regent's Park with Topol, Linda Thorson and Lisa O'Hare in the Lerner & Lowe musical, Gigi.

Television 
During the early 1960s, Martin was the resident singer of topical songs on the British weekly satire show That Was The Week That Was (1962–1963). Martin won a BAFTA TV Award for Light Entertainment Personality in 1964. One of the songs she sang on the show, the John F. Kennedy tribute "In the Summer of His Years", was released as a single and 'bubbled under' the Billboard Hot 100 chart at No 104 in 1963 (but was outcharted by a cover version by Connie Francis, which reached No 46). She has also released recordings in Swedish, such as the 7" single "Om du nånsin skulle ändra dej".

Martin had her own BBC television series between 1964 and 1966, titled Mainly Millicent for the first two series, and shortened to Millicent for the third and final series. For her work in this series she won the TV Society Award. In one episode, Martin and guest star Roger Moore performed a comedy skit in which Moore played secret agent James Bond some years before he was cast in the role. In the mid-1960s she guested, alongside Pete Murray and Kenneth Williams, in an edition of Juke Box Jury.

She appeared with Morecambe and Wise in their series "Two of a Kind" in the 1960s.

In 1969, Sir Lew Grade wanted to make a comedy film series, starring Martin, that would appeal to both American and British audiences. He sent six comedy sketches of Martin to producer Sheldon Leonard, who came up with the premise of From a Bird's Eye View. The series was not a success and was cancelled after 16 episodes had been filmed.

In 1977, on Jubilee Day, she appeared in a gala edition of BBC TV's The Good Old Days to celebrate the Queen's Silver Jubilee, performing in a double act with Julia McKenzie.

Martin appeared on $100,000 Pyramid in 1987 during the second week of the show's longest lasting tournament.

Martin appeared as Gladys Moon in 13 episodes of Moon and Son, a 1992 BBC detective series created by Robert Banks Stewart, and co-starring John Michie.

In 2005, she had a small part in the film, Mrs. Palfrey at the Claremont which starred Joan Plowright.

Her later television roles include Gertrude Moon, Daphne Moon's Mancunian mother, in the American sitcom Frasier. She has worked for the Disney Channel, starring in the shows The Suite Life of Zack & Cody, Jonas and in the film Return to Halloweentown. Other performances include guest roles in The Drew Carey Show, Will & Grace, Newhart and Days of Our Lives. She also had a small role on an episode of Gilmore Girls and a key role in an episode of Modern Family.

In 2011, she guest-starred opposite her former Frasier daughter, Jane Leeves, in the TV Land series Hot in Cleveland. She has also had an appearance in the fourth season of Chuck as the mother of Hartley Winterbottom, who was given the first Intersect prototype and became Alexei Volkoff; she also guest-starred on an episode of the fourth season of Castle as a theatre critic who wrote a harsh review of a performance given by Castle's mother.

From 2017 to 2022, she appeared in Grace and Frankie as Joan-Margaret.

Film 
In the mid-1960s, Martin appeared in the British feature films Nothing But the Best (1964), Those Magnificent Men in Their Flying Machines (1965), Stop the World – I Want to Get Off (1966), and Alfie (1966).

Personal life 

During the early 1960s Martin lived adjacent to Abbey Road studios. She was so close that she could occasionally hear producer George Martin speaking to the artists during a recording session.

She was married to the pop singer Ronnie Carroll from 1958 until 1965, and subsequently to actor Norman Eshley, but both marriages ended in divorce. She has been married to American Marc Alexander since 1978, and is now a permanent resident of the United States.

Filmography and stage work

Film

Stage

Television

References

External links

Mainly Millicent at BBC Comedy Guide

1934 births
English expatriates in the United States
English women singers
English film actresses
English soap opera actresses
English stage actresses
English television actresses
Living people
Parlophone artists
People from Romford